Elina Svitolina was the defending champion, but she didn't participate in 2011.

Ons Jabeur defeated Monica Puig 7–6(10–8), 6–1 in the final and won the title. She was the first girl from northern Africa to win a junior Grand Slam title.

Seeds

Main draw

Finals

Top half

Section 1

Section 2

Bottom half

Section 3

Section 4

References 
 Main draw

Girls' Singles
French Open, 2011 Girls' Singles